The church of the Santissima Trinità degli Spagnoli is a religious building in Naples, Italy, found in the piazza of the same name.

The structure was first built in 1573 and was ceded to the Spanish residents of the Quartieri Spagnoli, later it passed to the Order of the Santissima Trinità della Redenzione dei Cattivi, an order dedicated to the redemption of captives held in Muslim lands. This order had been instituted by Pope Innocent III. The church was rebuilt and the interior redecorated by the Trinitarians in 1788. The portico dates from the mid-17th century.

The church and convent were suppressed during the Napoleonic occupation. At the time a seventeenth-century altarpiece of the Santissima Trinità con la Madonna del Rimedio was looted.

Bibliography
Napoli e dintorni, Touring club Italia, Touring Editor, 2001.

Roman Catholic churches in Naples
16th-century Roman Catholic church buildings in Italy
Roman Catholic churches completed in 1573
Baroque architecture in Naples
1573 establishments in Italy
Quartieri Spagnoli